Alpana Mukherjee (née Banerjee) (14 March 1934 – 24 July 2009)  was a successful Bengali singer during the late 1940s and 1950s and onwards. Her most noted songs are "Trader Chumki Jole Akashe" "Hatti Matim Tim", "Mon Bolchhe Aaj Sandhyay", "Chotto Pakhi Chandana" and "Ami Alpana Enke Jai Aloy Chhayay" " Akash Ar Eai Mati Oi Dure" " Jodi Oli Na chahe".

Early life
At the age of 13, Alpana was discovered by her father's close friends, Robin Chattopadhyay and Gouri Prasanna Majumdar, who were very active as music composers and lyricists respectively in the Bengali music scene at that time. Her songs became very popular soon after.

Career
Alpana Banerjee's major popularity derived from singing children's songs, which she transformed from simple rhymes to immortal classics. Bengalis from the 1950s through the 1990s were raised on Alpana's classics like 'Hatti Matim Tim' or 'Chhotto Pakhi Chandana'.

Her modern songs received much more popularity. One of the earliest and notable Bengali non-film songs sung by Alpana was "Samiran Phire Chao" under Robin Chattopadhyay's baton. Soon after, in 1951, she recorded the song "Matir Ghare Aaj Nemechhe Chand Re" for the Bengali film 'Vidyasagar' with music once again by Robin Chattopadhay. This song became remarkably popular. Another notable Bengali film song by her, under Robin Chattopadhay's baton yet again, is "Hriday Amar Sundara Taba Paye" from the 1956 film 'Sagarika'. She sang many notable Bengali film and non-film songs in the 1950s under different music composers including Nachiketa Ghosh, Shyamal Mitra, Manabendra Mukhopadhyay, Sailen Mukhopadhyay and Bhupen Hazarika. Her voice was eloquent in capturing a variety of moods ranging from the romantic "Mon Bolchhe Aaj Sandhyay", to the frivolous 'Bakul Gandhe Jodi', 'Ami Alpana Enke Jai' and sombre 'Jetha Achhe Ogo Shudhu Nirabata'.

Alpana recorded a cover version of the Hindi film song 'Albela main ek dilwala' under Sachin Dev Burman's music direction. The regular version of this song was sung by Asha Bhonsle in the 1957 Hindi film 'Miss India'.

Alpana collaborated with many of her colleagues including Utpala Sen, Sandhya Mukhopadhyay, Shyamal Mitra (with whom she sang duets on many occasions), Manabendra Mukhopadhyay, and Hemanta Kumar Mukhopadhyay. She also sang with Lata Mangeshkar under the direction of Pandit Ravi Shankar.

She was often the guest of honour at Bengali music functions, TV programmes, and on AIR (All India Radio) programmes.

On All India Radio'-Calcutta's 'Ramyageeti' program, she sang songs tuned by internationally renowned Sarod player Ali Akbar Khan. She also toured most of the North Indian Radio stations singing in chain programs with All India Radio. She was noted to have given performances in all corners of West Bengal.

Besides touring within India and West Bengal, she also extensively toured in England. She performed at Durga Puja functions in places like Hampstead Town Hall, Belsize Park, King's Cross and gave performances at Bengali communities in Bradford, Leeds, Liverpool, Wolverhampton, West Ham, Seven Sisters, Finsbury Park, Islington, etc. She was interviewed by BBC London on several occasions.

Personal life
Alpana Banerjee was married to Sridhar Mukherjee and resided in Calcutta, West Bengal, India. She got married in 1959 and celebrated her 50th wedding anniversary in 2009. She is survived by two children and two grandchildren. Her daughter lives in Chelsea, London and her son in Mumbai, India. Notable Bengali singer Sandhya Mukhopadhyay remains a close family friend.

Death
Alpana Banerjee died on 24 July 2009 at the age of 75. Many of her contemporary musicians whom she had befriended 50 years back (including Sandhya Mukhopadhyay) visited and paid their last respects. Among those paying their respects were Railway minister Mamata Banerjee and chief minister of West Bengal Buddhadeb Bhattacharjee. Despite not being actively involved in the commercial music scene for many decades, the news of her death was covered by Indian media.

Playback songs

Alpana Banerjee was a playback singer in the following Bengali films:
Bidyasagar
Sahodor
Bidhilipi
Bhangagara
Kori o Kamal
Nouka Bilas
Shubhada (she received best singer award in 1952 from the above film)
Satir Dehatyag
Satir Patalprabesh
Mathur
Saat Number Kaedi
Agnipariksha
Draupadi
Dersho Khokar kando
Kar Papey
Bhisma
Nagini Kanyar Kahini (music directed by Pandit Ravi Shankar)
Hya
Boudir Bon
Shilpi
Lakshya Bhrasta
Personal Assistant
Nashtanir
Manmoyee Girls' School
Asampta
Dashyu Mohan
Maa o Chhele
Lakshya Heera
Rakto Sandhya
Bikram Urbashi
Chhele Kaar
Naa
Pathe Holo Deri
Ora Thake Odhare
Sagarika
Kirtigar
Chhobi
Brindaban Lila
Saheb Bibi Golam
Sandhyaraag
Ektara
Sribatsa Chinta
Adrishya Manush
Prashna
Prithibi Amare Chay
She lent her voice in many more films; the above films contain her most noted songs.

Recorded Songs

These are some of her songs recorded with HMV saregama:
Mon Bolchhe Aaj Sandhyay
Ami Alpana Enke Jai
Bakulgandhe Jodi Batas
Tarader Chumki Jwale Akashe
Jodi Tomar Jibane
Eto Manjari Keno Aaj Phutechhe
Aabchha Megher Oma Gaaye
Ogo Tomay Chaowa
Papiya Keno Aar Piya Dako
Shiyarer Deep Jodi
Jetha Aachte Shudhu Nirabata
Akash Aar Ei Mati
O Guner Naiyare
Amar Shyam Shuk Pakhi Go
Ami Sundar Bole
Tomar Moner Rang Legechhe
Chhotto Pakhi Chandana
Phire Phire Chay Ke Je
Bolechhile Tumi Gaan Shonabe
Samiran Phire Chao
Matir Ghare Aaj Nemechhe Chand
Hriday Amar Sundar Tabo

Nursery Rhymes
These are some of her nursery Rhymes recorded with HMV Saregama.
Hatti Matim Tim
Moymar Ma Moynamoti
Dol Dol Duluni
Agdum Bagdum Ghoradum
Jamunaboti Saraswati
Sajalpurer Kajol Meye
Khuku Jabe Sashur Bari
Chhotto Pahki Chandana
Bideshini Kader Rani
Chandrakala Baranmala
Nache Nache Putul Nache
Otho Otho Surjai
Charka Kate Buri
Poushali Sandhya Ghoom Ghoom Tandra
Kana Machi Bho Bho
Hoi Hollar Sorgol
Chat Pot Uthe Paro
Aye Re Ay Cheler Pal

References

Bengali musicians
1934 births
2009 deaths
Singers from Kolkata
Women musicians from West Bengal
Indian women composers
20th-century Indian women singers
20th-century Indian singers